Lewis Robert Elder (10 March 1905 – 15 May 1971) was a Canadian cyclist. He competed in three events at the 1928 Summer Olympics.

References

External links
 

1905 births
1971 deaths
Canadian male cyclists
Olympic cyclists of Canada
Cyclists at the 1928 Summer Olympics
Sportspeople from Derry (city)